Rhys Thomas (born 12 December 1978) is a British director, producer, actor, comedian and writer.

He is most famous for his roles in Star Stories, The Fast Show, Sirens and Nathan Barley. He also appears as Gary Bellamy on Radio 4's Down the Line and its television spin-off, Bellamy's People. Thomas was nominated for the Breakthrough Talent Award at the 2013 BAFTA Awards for producing and directing the acclaimed feature-length documentary Freddie Mercury: The Great Pretender and subsequently won Best Arts Documentary in both the 2013 Rose D'Or and International Emmy Awards.  He co-wrote, produced, directed and co-starred in the critically acclaimed spoof music documentary series on BBC Four and BBC Two.

His latest project, Dodger, a prequel to Oliver Twist first aired on CBBC on 6th February 2022. Following a positive audience reaction, it then also aired on BBC One in 13th March 2022. Three new specials were filmed in the summer of 2022.  The programme won a BAFTA and RTS Award for Best Scripted Children's Programme in 2022.

Early life
Thomas, who has Welsh parents, grew up in Basildon, Essex. 
While in the sixth form at Beauchamps High School in Wickford, Essex, Thomas made comedy videos with friends, forming a comedy group called Stay Alive Pepi with Stephen Burge, Tony Way and Glynne Wiley. Thomas began his TV career when he phoned the production company for Shooting Stars to ask for studio audience tickets. When they told him that they did not have any he asked if he could be given work experience. They happened to need a runner and employed him, sometimes filling in for George Dawes on the drums during rehearsals for the show. His breakthrough came when he showed Charlie Higson and Bob Mortimer some of his comedy tapes and Higson recruited Thomas as a supporting cast member on The Fast Show, in which he made recurring appearances, notably as Paul, the young assistant to the Charlie Higson character, oily used-car-dealer "Swiss Toni". He became script editor on Shooting Stars in a later series.

Career
In addition to his work on The Fast Show, in 1997 Thomas made a BBC Two pilot with Ulrika Jonsson called It's Ulrika written by Vic Reeves and Bob Mortimer. In 1998 he starred in Shooting Stars and The Fast Show Live at the Hammersmith Apollo, the sketch show Barking for Channel 4 alongside Mackenzie Crook, Catherine Tate, Peter Kay and David Walliams and appeared at the Edinburgh Fringe Festival with Stay Alive Pepi. He also appeared in Sir Bernard Chumley's Stately Homes and the pilot show Crazy Jonathan's with Matt Lucas and David Walliams. In 1999 he worked
as a team writer on series one of The 11 O'Clock Show and was a radio presenter on the XFM breakfast show with Natasha Desborough.

At the age of 20 Thomas wrote a pilot script for Fun at the Funeral Parlour. The producer Simon Lupton was impressed, and submitted it to Stuart Murphy, the then controller of BBC Choice, and a series was filmed in summer 2000 and a second series 2001. Guest stars included Tom Baker, Paul Whitehouse, Charlie Higson, Bill Oddie, Christopher Cazenove, Phil Cornwell, Mitchell and Webb, Lucas and Walliams, Simon Day, Mark Williams, Anita Dobson, Art Malik and Dudley Sutton. Music was specially composed by Brian May of Queen.

Thomas has appeared in several other comedy series including Happiness, Monkey Trousers, Nathan Barley, the Channel 4 comedy Star Stories playing Jude Law, Andrew Ridgeley, Warren Beatty, Gary Glitter, Daniel Day-Lewis, Kiefer Sutherland and The Fonz amongst others. He wrote for and appears in the Channel 4 sketch show Blunder.

In 2002–2004, he co-wrote and starred in two series of Swiss Toni, writing four episodes and co-writing others. He also toured with The Fast Show for its farewell tour in 2002. He subsequently appeared on several panel shows and talking head programmes including  Fanorama with David Mitchell (2001/2), Does Doug Know with Daisy Donovan on Channel 4 (2002), Law of the Playground (2006), Comedian's Comedian (2005), Nathan Barley (2005), 8 Out of 10 Cats (2006), FAQ U (2005), Charlie Brooker's Screenwipe (2006), Tittybangbang (2005) and Rob Brydon's Annually Retentive (2007).

From 2006 to 2013 Thomas played the host of BBC Radio 4's spoof late-night phone-in, Down the Line. The programme was the 2007 winner of the Broadcasting Press Guild Radio Programme of the Year Award and in 2008 it received the Sony Gold Award for Best Radio Comedy. In January 2010 Down the Line was adapted into a television format called Bellamy's People starring and co-written by Thomas as Gary Bellamy. It was launched and gained a positive critical reception with The Radio Times praising Thomas for his straight man role and the ability to make those around him seem even funnier.

Thomas has worked closely with the rock band Queen, of whom he is a major fan, producing seven of their DVDs: Greatest Video Hits 1 (2002), Queen Live at Wembley (2003), Greatest Video Hits 2 (2003), Jewels (2004), Queen on Fire – Live at the Bowl (2004), Queen + Paul Rodgers: Return of the Champions and A Night at the Opera - 30th Anniversary, making documentaries and directing new videos, including I Was Born to Love You. In 2003, he wrote, starred and co-directed (with Simon Lupton) a commercial for Queen Greatest Video Hits 2 also starring Roger Taylor and Brian May. In July 2010, Thomas was asked by Jim Beach, manager of Queen to write the sleeve notes for all 15 studio albums by the band, due for re-release in 2011 to coincide with the band's 40th. He also produced the critically acclaimed two-part Queen documentary Days of Our Lives, which was broadcast on BBC2 in May 2011. In 2012, he produced and directed a feature-length documentary about Freddie Mercury, The Great Pretender, released in September. On 31 December 2010, Thomas appeared on and won Celebrity Mastermind with a specialist subject record score of 21 points and a total 36 points. His specialist subject was Queen.

In 2009 Thomas appeared in a mockumentary film Beyond the Pole starring with Stephen Mangan, Helen Baxendale and Mark Benton. The film was premiered at the Prince Charles Cinema as part of the London Film Festival on 5 December 2009, and was released nationwide in February 2010.

In April 2009, Thomas appeared in BBC switch's show, Winging it, playing the character of a music mogul, and wrote and starred in Above Their Stations, a sitcom pilot about Police Community Support Officers for BBC Three, also starring Simon Day, Dudley Sutton and Denis Lawson. He also created, co-wrote and co-produced Brian Pern, a series of online spoof blogs starring Simon Day as Brian Pern, an ageing progressive rock musician based on Peter Gabriel, Brian Eno and other intelligent, politically active rock artists of that ilk. In 2014, The Life of Rock with Brian Pern was broadcast on BBC Four, a series directed, produced and co-written by Thomas. A second series was broadcast on BBC Two, and a third series was broadcast on BBC Four in early 2016. A final one-off special aired in spring 2017. The series were memorable for the number of cameos and guest appearances by real life musicians, actors and personalities who appeared.

He was the lead in the critically acclaimed Channel 4 comedy-drama Sirens, first broadcast in June 2011.

In November 2013 Thomas appeared in the one-off 50th anniversary comedy homage The Five(ish) Doctors Reboot.

From 2016 to 2018 and again in 2020, Thomas wrote and directed an annual comedy review show on BBC Four A Year in the Life of a Year reviewing the happenings of the previous year.

His latest project, Dodger, a prequel to Oliver Twist first aired on CBBC on 6th February 2022. Following a positive audience reaction, it then also aired on BBC One on 13th March 2022. A second series has yet to be announced. Thomas, Montgomery and other cast members also partook in a BBC Education Series about the Victorian Era for schools.

Personal life
Thomas is married to actress Lucy Montgomery. They have two daughters and live in east London. He is a member of the British show business charitable organisation the Grand Order of Water Rats.

References

External links
 

1978 births
20th-century English male actors
21st-century English male actors
English male comedians
English people of Welsh descent
English male radio actors
English male television actors
Living people
Male actors from Essex
People from Brentwood, Essex
People from Wickford